Bashan (or Basanitis) is the ancient, biblical name used for the northernmost region of the Transjordan during the Iron Age. It is situated in modern-day Syria. Its western part, nowadays known as the Golan Heights, was captured by Israel during the 1967 Six Day War and annexed in 1981.

Bashan is mentioned 59 times in the Hebrew Bible. It is the location of Ashtaroth Karnaim and Edrei (modern-day Daraa). Biblical tradition holds that an Amorite kingdom in Bashan was conquered by the Israelites during the reign of King Og. Throughout the monarchic period, Bashan was contested between the kingdoms of Israel and Aram-Damascus. The name fell out of use in classical antiquity, in which the region was divided into four districts: Batanaea, Gaulanitis, Trachonitis and Auranitis.

History

Hebrew Bible 

Book of Numbers tells that King Og of Bashan came out against the Israelites led by Moses at the time of their entrance into the Promised Land, but was vanquished in battle.  states:Then we turned, and went up the way to Bashan: and Og the king of Bashan came out against us, he and all his people, to battle at Edrei. And the  said unto me, Fear him not: for I will deliver him, and all his people, and his land, into thy hand; and thou shalt do unto him as thou didst unto Sihon king of the Amorites, which dwelt at Heshbon. So the  our God delivered into our hands Og also, the king of Bashan, and all his people: and we smote him until none was left to him remaining. And we took all his cities at that time, there was not a city which we took not from them, threescore cities, all the region of Argob, the kingdom of Og in Bashan. All these cities were fenced with high walls, gates, and bars; beside unwalled towns a great many. And we utterly destroyed them, as we did unto Sihon king of Heshbon, utterly destroying the men, women, and children, of every city. But all the cattle, and the spoil of the cities, we took for a prey to ourselves.
Along with the half of Gilead, it was given to the half-tribe of Manasseh. According to the book of Joshua, Golan, one of its cities, became a Levitical city and a city of refuge. Argob, in Bashan, was one of Solomon's commissariat districts.

In the late-9th century BCE, the cities of Bashan were taken by Hazael, monarch of the Syrian kingdom of Aram-Damascus, but were soon after reconquered by Jehoash who overcame the Syrians in three battles, according to the prophecy of Elisha.

From this time, Bashan almost disappears from history, although we read about the wild cattle of its rich pastures, the oaks of its forests, the beauty of its extensive plains, and the rugged majesty of its mountains. Bashan is also mentioned in : "[The Gadites] lived in Gilead, in Bashan and its outlying villages, and on all the pasturelands of Sharon as far as they extended."

Later periods 
The Bashan was ultimately conquered and pillaged by the Assyrian Empire, which held onto it from 732 to 610 BCE. It later saw security and prosperity under Achaemenid rule; its settlements became better developed and culturally Aramized.

References

Further reading 
 
 
 Porter, Rev. J. L. (1867). The Giant Cities of Bashan; and Syria's Holy Places.

External links
 Golan Heights (Biblical Bashan) on Bibleplaces

States and territories established in the 2nd millennium BC
States and territories disestablished in the 8th century BC
Hebrew Bible regions
Torah places
Transjordan (region)
Former kingdoms